Bilenke is a village in Bilhorod-Dnistrovskyi Raion, Odesa Oblast (province) of Ukraine. It belongs to Shabo rural hromada, one of the hromadas of Ukraine.

Demographics
Native language as of the Ukrainian Census of 2001:
 Ukrainian 81.15%
 Russian 14.35%
 Romani 1.5%
 Moldovan 1.26%
 Bulgarian 0.79%
 German 0.32%
 Gagauz 0.16%
 Belarusian 0.08%

References

Villages in Bilhorod-Dnistrovskyi Raion